Planning and development in Detroit since the late 20th century has attempted to enhance the economy and quality of life of Detroit, Michigan, United States. In 1970, the private group Detroit Renaissance began to facilitate development in the city. Its successor, Business Leaders for Michigan, has continued to facilitate development into the 21st century. Projects have included new commercial facilities, revitalization of neighborhoods, hospitality infrastructure, and improvements to recreational and public facilities, such as the QLine light rail project.

History

In 1970, Henry Ford II conceived of the Renaissance Center as a way to help the city retain residents who were moving to the suburbs. The group announced the first phase of construction in 1971. Detroit Mayor Roman Gribbs touted the project as part of "a complete rebuilding from bridge to bridge," referring to the area between the Ambassador Bridge that connected Detroit to Windsor, Ontario and the MacArthur Bridge, which connects the city with Belle Isle Park. He presented architectural renderings of "linked riverfront parks" from Renaissance Center to MacArthur Bridge, like a necklace, for public access.

The first Renaissance Center tower opened on July 1, 1976. Architects' initial design for the Renaissance Center focused on creating secure interior spaces, while its design later expanded to connect with the exterior spaces and waterfront through a reconfigured interior, open glass entryways, and a Wintergarden.

Late in 1973, Detroit elected its first African-American mayor, Coleman Young. During his administration, major developments completed included a combination of residential, retail, business, and retail projects:  Renaissance Center, the Joe Louis Arena, the Detroit People Mover, the General Motors Detroit/Hamtramck Assembly Plant, Detroit Receiving Hospital, the Chrysler Jefferson North Assembly Plant, the Riverfront Condominiums, the Millender Center Apartments, Harbortown, 150 West Jefferson, One Detroit Center and restoration of the Fox Theatre.

Dennis Archer, a former Michigan Supreme Court Justice and mayor in the mid-to-late 1990s, supported a plan to add casinos as a catalyst for development in Detroit. Initially, his plan was for a casino cluster along the east riverfront. Ultimately, three large hotels with attached casinos were constructed in or near Detroit's downtown area: the Greektown Casino Hotel, the MGM Grand Detroit, and the Motor City Casino. In 2007, USA Today reported that the State of Michigan received more than $8.3 million yearly from Detroit's three casinos, and that in 2006 Detroit ranked fifth in U.S. casino markets with $1.3 billion in annual revenue. Archer also championed the construction of two new sports stadiums, Ford Field for the Detroit Lions and Comerica Park for the Detroit Tigers.

In June 2007, the Detroit Riverfront Conservancy, a 501(c)(3) organization, celebrated the first significant opening of new public space on the Detroit International Riverfront since its inception in early 2003. It has raised hundreds of millions of dollars to develop and manage Detroit's riverfront. The International Riverfront area ranges from the Ambassador Bridge to Belle Isle in downtown Detroit, encompassing a multitude of parks, restaurants, retail shops, skyscrapers, and high-rise residential areas along the Detroit River.

In 2009, Detroit Renaissance expanded its mission to address the need for regional economic development; the successor organization, Business Leaders for Michigan, is a group that gives thousands of dollars to Republican political campaigns. It is devoted to the creation of the Newt Gingrich-supported Michigan Turnaround Plan. Other participants in area revitalization efforts include the Detroit Riverfront Conservancy, the Detroit Economic Club, the Detroit Club, Cityscape Detroit, universities in the Detroit region, and the Michigan Economic Development Corporation, which has offices in the Cadillac Place state office complex in the city's New Center area.

In recognition of the city's architecture and historic significance, many of the city's buildings and districts have been listed on the National Register of Historic Places. They are eligible for federal historic tax credits for development. State tax historic tax credits are also available for qualified historic preservation.

Initiatives

Some of Detroit's successful revitalizations include the New Center, Lafayette Park, East Ferry Avenue Historic District, Campus Martius, Grand Circus Park Historic District, and Washington Boulevard Historic District. In 2002, a major renovation of the historic Cadillac Place consolidated state offices from around the area into the city's New Center area. In 2003, General Motors completed a $500 million redevelopment of the Renaissance Center as its world headquarters.

The east riverfront promenade development for the Detroit International Riverfront was planned at $559 million, including $135 million from GM and $50 million from the Kresge Foundation. The city has completed major redevelopment of Campus Martius Park and Cadillac Square Park. The plans have produced new downtown stadiums and a rebuilt freeway system intended to showcase the city for Super Bowl XL. With $1.6 billion in construction projects in 2004, the rapid pace of development in the city prompted construction of a $30 million cement terminal. In 2007, Bank of America announced that it would commit $25 billion to community development in Michigan following its acquisition of LaSalle Bank in Troy.

For 2010, the domestic automakers reported significant profits, indicating the beginning of rebound. Between 2009 and 2010, Detroit ranked seventh in the nation for economic recovery. A study conducted in 2006 by the University of Michigan-Dearborn determined that, in addition to the roughly 18,000 employees at the Detroit Metropolitan Wayne County Airport, activity had generated an additional 14,500 jobs in Wayne County and another 70,000 statewide, primarily through firms such as hotels, restaurants, and rental car agencies. The study made the assumption that passenger traffic through the airport and economic activity in these service industries would increase on a 1:1 ratio.

The Wayne County Airport Authority saw the potential for growth in the air transportation sector almost a decade ago, and began a capital improvement plan for the airport. The three original terminals from the 1950s were replaced by two new state-of-the-art terminals that opened in 2002 and 2008, respectively. Other major infrastructure improvements have been made to the runways, cargo facilities, and the terminals themselves, with an eye toward increasing the airport's capacity. At the time, the FAA forecasted a 15.2% growth in passenger travel from 2005 to 2010, and another 12.8% increase from 2010 to 2015. It was projected that the construction projects themselves would create 4,470 jobs, with an additional 21,500 jobs statewide due to increased passenger traffic.

One major focus of the capital improvement plan was to enhance Detroit's international gateway. Total travel has grown due to a surge in international travel, and international flights continued to increase before the recession negatively affected such flights at many airports.

Some other economic development initiatives in Detroit include the following:
The Detroit Office of Targeted Business Development is also working to “utilize the City’s enormous buying power to re-circulate Detroit dollars within the local economy as many times as possible and to work collaboratively with other City agencies such as the Mayor’s Office of Neighborhood Commercial Revitalization (ONCR), with the ultimate goal of building and sustaining both the commercial infrastructure and the residential neighborhoods, thus transforming the Next Detroit." This includes facilitating the startup and growth of Detroit-based, women-owned businesses; Detroit-based minority-owned businesses; and Detroit-based small businesses.
The Michigan Small Business Technology Development Center works to strengthen companies, create new jobs, retain existing jobs, and assist companies in defining their path to success.
The Detroit Economic Growth Corporation (DEGC) manages major economic development initiatives on behalf of the City of Detroit, including transforming the East Riverfront District, developing the I-94 Industrial Park, managing the Lower Woodward Improvement Program, and creating the Paradise Valley Cultural and Entertainment District. The DEGC also provides staff services to Detroit's public development authorities.
The City of Detroit Downtown Development Authority supports private investments and business growth within Detroit's central business district with loans, sponsorships and grants, capital improvements to public infrastructure, and other programs that increase economic activity.
The Detroit Brownfield Redevelopment Authority (DBRA) to promote revitalization of environmental clean-up areas within the boundaries of the City of Detroit. The DBRA has approved over 160 brownfield plans, which are expected create $6 billion in new investments, 13,000 jobs, and over 9,000 housing units.
The Economic Development Corporation of the City of Detroit assists local industrial and commercial enterprises to strengthen and revitalize the city and state economy through a loan program, public infrastructure improvements, and other programs.
The Office of Neighborhood Commercial Revitalization (ONCR) has created a system of support services and strategies to targeted commercial strips, incorporating technical assistance and training, grants, and loans to address local business development. Some programs from the ONCR include Re$tore Detroit, ReFresh Detroit, and Small Business Detroit! Microloan, all of which provide financial support and assistance.
The Michigan Works! System is the first unified workforce development system in the country and an instrumental partner for developing Michigan's economic future. The system comprises twenty-five agencies that focus on innovative, proactive solutions to meet the demands of a rapidly changing economy.
Some experts believe that Detroit needs to utilize the region's rich automotive history to break into new industries, such as battery technology, hybrid vehicles, and the auto parts industry, along with auto assembly.
Other experts believe that Detroit's geographic location next to Canada provides a unique opportunity for trade and organizational growth.  For example, Detroit's Wayne State University and the University of Windsor, Canada host an annual business symposium in order to tap into this strategic advantage and expand cross-border partnerships between Detroit and the Windsor region.

Quality of life initiatives, including the revitalization of parks, residential units, new construction, and historic renovations are at the forefront of the city's plan to accelerate redevelopment across the city. For instance, in 2004, the city added hundreds of new residential units to its downtown area.  From 2000 to 2007, the city saw continuous annual increases in tax revenues from its casinos with the city estimated to collect $178.25 million in casino taxes alone for 2007, with the casino resorts opening in 2008.

Urban infrastructure 
In October 2013, approval was given to John Hantz, a successful financial consultant in Detroit, who is devoting $30 million of his own funding to create Hantz Farms, a commercial urban forestry initiative; Hantz Woodlands, an urban tree farm project; and redevelopment of a blighted Detroit residential area covering nearly 180 acres on the city's east side. The Hantz project area is bordered by Van Dyke on the west, St. Jean on the east, Mack Avenue on the north and Jefferson on the south.

On December 6, 2013, bankruptcy judge Steven Rhodes approved a $210 million financing arrangement for overhauling the city's antiquated lighting system.

On December 13, 2013, the Public Lighting Authority (PLA) completed the initial sale of $60 million in bonds, part of a $210 million, two-step bond issue, to finance the purchase of up to 50,000 LED street lights. The new 150 watt LED lights are longer-lasting, are more than twice as bright as the old 70 Watt sodium lights, and are more affordable to operate. The goal was to have the installation completed in all neighborhoods by the end of 2015, and underground wiring of the thoroughfares done by the end of 2016.

On June 12, 2014, Detroit's Public Lighting Authority, created to take up fixing nonworking streetlights throughout the city, said that it would borrow $185 million in bonds, $20 million more than it initially had planned, after Standard & Poor's graded the agency's credit risk as relatively low, and compared with that of the bankrupt city. The sale of these bonds means an additional 15,00 lights will bring the total number of new LED street lights to 64,500.

On July 20, 2014, Olympia Development announced a three-year development plan, starting in September 2014. The centerpiece of the plan is the construction of a new $863 million Little Caesars Arena, and concurrently with another $200 million in apartments, restaurants, office buildings, parks and shops over 45-50 blocks of Downtown and Midtown areas, creating a new sports and entertainment district, known as "The District Detroit". Additionally, Olympia is now promising to spend “tens of millions” more for infrastructure improvements in the district, mainly around Cass Park, west of the arena site to create a new mixed-use neighborhood. Plans include a new 130 to 170-room hotel north of I-75 at Henry and Woodward that likely would be a third-party development. All together, the area stretches from Charlotte Street, the street north of Temple Street, south to Grand Circus Park, east to the existing stadiums, and to a northwestern boundary abutting the MotorCity Casino Hotel in North Corktown.

On July 28, 2014, M-1 Rail officially started construction. The streetcar line will stretch from downtown Detroit to the Amtrak rail station in New Center, continuing to just north of Grand Boulevard. There will be 20 stations serving 12 stops, with most of the stations being curbside on either side of Woodward Avenue going uptown or downtown, but changing to center road stations at the north and south ends of the system. The streetcar line was expected to be operational by mid-2017.

On October 13, 2015, Wayne State University opened its new $92 million, 207,000-square-foot Integrative Biosciences Center (IBio). As many as 500 researchers and staff will work out of the IBio Center located at 6135 Woodward Avenue.

On May 3, 2016, M-1 Rail announced the opening of the Penske Tech Center, which will serve as  its headquarters, operations center, and streetcar maintenance facility, located just north of Grand Boulevard on Woodward Avenue in New Center.

On March 14, 2016, the Michigan Humane Society opened its new and expanded $15.5 million animal care campus on five acres, which includes a 35,000-square-foot, state-of-the-art veterinary facility, located just east of New Center at 7887 Chrysler Drive near Clay Street. The society said the larger facility will enable it to expand its teaching and training opportunities with Michigan State University's College of Veterinary Medicine.

On December 5, 2016, the Henry Ford Health System announced the start of a second development beginning in the spring of 2017 on its evolving 300-acre South Campus site in New Center, with the construction of a new $150–160 million, 187,000-square-foot, six-story Brigitte Harris Cancer Pavilion, scheduled to open in early 2020, along with a skywalk across West Grand Boulevard to connect it to the Henry Ford Hospital.

Detroit also plans both public and private redevelopment of Brush Park, the Brewster Recreation Center, and the nearby Eastern Market site.

Neighborhood revitalization

In April 2008, the city unveiled a $300 million stimulus plan to create jobs and revitalize neighborhoods, financed by city bonds and paid for by earmarking about 15% of the wagering tax. The city's plans for revitalization with the Next Detroit Neighborhood Initiative, a 501 (c)(3) organization, include 7-Mile/Livernois, Brightmoor, East English Village, Grand River/Greenfield, North-End, and Osborn. Private organizations have pledged substantial funding to neighborhood revitalization efforts.

A new master plan draft prepared in 2004 has the city composed of ten clusters of neighborhood areas and commercial districts. The plan revealed that Detroit has many growing neighborhoods with youth population increases of greater than ten percent within each cluster, while also showing that larger youth population losses were focused in certain areas, providing support for the concept of focused redevelopment and planning. The city issued a Strategic Master Plan in 2006.  In addition to increased business investment, the city's revitalization has been focused on retaining young professionals.  The city has cleared a  section of land to initiate the Far Eastside Plan for new neighborhood construction and revitalizations. A 2009 parcel survey found 86 percent of the city's homes to be in good condition, with another 9% needing only minor repairs. The survey found 33,527 or 10% of the city's housing to be unoccupied, but recommended that only one percent or 3,480 of the city's housing units needed to be demolished. About 3,000 of these residential structures were cleared away in 2010.

Immigrants have successfully contributed to the city's neighborhood revitalization, especially in southwest Detroit. This area has experienced a thriving economy in recent years, as evidenced by new housing, increased business openings and the recently opened Mexicantown International Welcome Center.

Lafayette Park is a revitalized neighborhood on the city's east side, part of the Mies van der Rohe Residential District listed in the National Register of Historic Places.  The  urban renewal project was originally called the Gratiot Park Development. Planned by van der Rohe, Ludwig Hilberseimer and Alfred Caldwell, it includes a landscaped,  park with no through traffic, in which these and other low-rise apartment buildings are situated. Churches, schools, parks, theaters, and retail businesses have helped to anchor neighborhoods in the city.

Partial list of residential developments

Old buildings in the city are being transformed into lofts, condominiums, and high rise residential apartment units at an accelerated pace along with new Formstone and brick rowhouse construction.

Alden Park Towers (2014).
Riverfront Towers (2014).
Town Residences (2014)
The Albert (2014)
David Whitney Building, hotel & apartments (2014)
David Broderick Tower (2012)
Westin Book-Cadillac, hotel & condominiums (2008)
1001 Woodward, luxury condominiums (2007)

Many more projects are in the process of planning/rendering, and this is all helping bring back more residents to the downtown area.

Buildings
Significant renovations are being undertaken by luxury hotel developers downtown such as Hilton, Westin, Double Tree, and Four Seasons. Some buildings are being redeveloped into high-rise condominiums and residential lofts. These projects are attracting new investment in corporate headquarters, offices, and retail. The city has demolished many unused buildings in order to make way for new development. Highlights of some of the significant renovated buildings and vacant structures are noted below:

Renovated structures

Vacant structures

Major structures demolished

See also

 Adaptive reuse
 Building restoration
 Historic preservation

References

Further reading

External links
Planning & Development Department - City of Detroit
Model D Media
New Center Council

Planning
Economy of Detroit
.03
Government of Detroit
Detroit, Planning And Development